Bed and Board is a 1970 French comedy-drama film directed by François Truffaut, and starring Jean-Pierre Léaud and Claude Jade. It is the fourth in Truffaut's series of five films about Antoine Doinel, and directly follows Stolen Kisses, depicting the married life of Antoine (Léaud) and Christine (Jade). Love on the Run finished the story in 1979.

Plot
Antoine and Christine have got married and are living in a pleasant apartment that her parents have found for them. In it she gives violin lessons, while he works in the courtyard dyeing carnations for flower shops. When his experiments with colouring agents go horribly wrong, he has to find other work. An American company hires him to demonstrate model boats to potential customers in a mock-up harbour. Christine has a baby boy, which she calls Ghislain but he registers as Alphonse. At work he meets a Japanese girl, who invites him for a meal in her apartment. An affair starts, which Christine becomes aware of when she finds little hidden love letters. Antoine is banished from the bedroom and eventually moves out to a hotel, while Christine makes a life for herself and the baby. Antoine, bored and restless in a pointless existence, keeps telephoning her and at the end she is probably ready to take him back.

Cast
 Jean-Pierre Léaud as Antoine Doinel
 Claude Jade as Christine Doinel
 Daniel Ceccaldi as Lucien Darbon
 Claire Duhamel as Madame Darbon
 Hiroko Berghauer as Kyoko
 Daniel Boulanger as Tenor
 Silvana Blasi as Tenor's wife
 Pierre Fabri as the office Romeo
 Barbara Laage as Monique, secretary
 Billy Kearns as M. Max
 Claude Véga as the Strangler
 Jacques Jouanneau as Césarin
 Danièle Girard as Ginette, a waitress
 Jacques Robiolles as Sponger
 Yvon Lec as the Traffic Warden
 Marie Irakane as Mrs Martin, a concierge
 Ernest Menzer as the little man
 Jacques Rispal as Old Solitary
 Philippe Léotard as a Drunkard
 Pierre Maguelon as Cérasin's friend
 Guy Pierrault as an SOS employee
 Marcel Mercier as a person in the courtyard
 Joseph Merieau as a person in the courtyard
 Christian de Tiliere as a Senator
 Nobuko Mati as Kyoko's friend
 Iska Khan as Kyoko's father
 Marie Dedieu as Marie, a prostitute
 Jacques Cottin as Monsieur Hulot (uncredited)

Critical reception
John Simon wrote that Bed and Board "gives no offense, and no enlightenment".

Awards and nominations

References

External links
 
 
 
Bed and Board an essay by Noah Baumbach at the Criterion Collection

1970 films
1970s romantic comedy-drama films
French romantic comedy-drama films
Films directed by François Truffaut
Antoine Doinel
Films with screenplays by François Truffaut
1970s French-language films
1970s French films